Ivan Kanev (born 21 December 1984) is a Bulgarian footballer who currently plays as a midfielder for Botev Galabovo.

External links

Bulgarian footballers
1984 births
Living people
Association football midfielders
First Professional Football League (Bulgaria) players
PFC Beroe Stara Zagora players
FC Botev Galabovo players
Sportspeople from Stara Zagora